The Men's 5000 metres event took place on 6 October 2010 at the Jawaharlal Nehru Stadium.

Final

References

Men's 5000 metres
2010